Results from the 1997 Monaco Grand Prix Formula Three held at Monte Carlo on May 10, 1997, in the Circuit de Monaco.

Classification 

Grand Prix Formula Three
Monaco Grand Prix
Motorsport in Monaco